Timothy ( Timótheos) was an Ammonite general of the mid 2nd century BCE of the Seleucid Empire. He fought during the Maccabee campaigns of 163 BC against the Jews of Ammon and Gilead, and eventually the Maccabee rebel army themselves.  He was eventually defeated by Judas Maccabeus at Dathema in Gilead.

No Greek records of Timothy remain, so all that is known of him are hostile accounts from the Jewish books of 1 Maccabees and 2 Maccabees.  He appears briefly in Josephus's Antiquities of the Jews, but Josephus does not add any details on him not already in 1 Maccabees.  According to these sources, Timothy hired mercenaries, both Arabs and Asian horsemen, and used those forces in a local struggle with the Jews of Ammon and Gilead.  Judas Maccabeus's intervention drove him off and saved the besieged Jews, and according to 2 Maccabees, Timothy died, although the timing of when and how is somewhat unclear due to 2 Maccabees seemingly describing the events out-of-order.

References

2nd-century BC people
Seleucid people in the books of the Maccabees